Ælfhelm is a given name. Notable people with the name include:

Ælfhelm of Dorchester (died 1007/9), bishop of Dorchester
Ælfhelm of York (died 1006), ealdorman of southern Northumbria

Old English given names
Masculine given names